ISO 3166-2:CV is the entry for Cabo Verde in ISO 3166-2, part of the ISO 3166 standard published by the International Organization for Standardization (ISO), which defines codes for the names of the principal subdivisions (e.g., provinces or states) of all countries coded in ISO 3166-1.

Currently for Cabo Verde, ISO 3166-2 codes are defined for two levels of subdivisions:
 2 geographical regions (i.e., the Barlavento Islands and the Sotavento Islands)
 22 municipalities

Each code consists of two parts, separated by a hyphen. The second part is either of the following:
 one letter: geographical regions
 two letters: municipalities

Current codes
Subdivision names are listed as in the ISO 3166-2 standard published by the ISO 3166 Maintenance Agency (ISO 3166/MA).

Click on the button in the header to sort each column.

Geographical regions

Municipalities

Changes
The following changes to the entry have been announced in newsletters by the ISO 3166/MA since the first publication of ISO 3166-2 in 1998:

See also
 Subdivisions of Cape Verde
 FIPS region codes of Cape Verde

External links
 ISO Online Browsing Platform: CV
 Counties of Cape Verde, Statoids.com

2:CV
ISO 3166-2
Cape Verde geography-related lists